The Kaeo River is a river of the far north of New Zealand's North Island. It flows through the north of the North Auckland Peninsula, reaching the sea at the Whangaroa Harbour. The small town of Kaeo sits on its banks,  from the river's mouth.

See also
List of rivers of New Zealand

References

Rivers of the Northland Region
Rivers of New Zealand